Urmston Grammar (known as Urmston Grammar School until September 2010), is a  co-educational grammar school in Urmston, Greater Manchester, England. It is an academy located within the Trafford Local Authority area, though not controlled by it.

History
Founded in 1929, Urmston Grammar was initially co-Ed but in the early 60s a new Urmston Grammar School for Boys was built due to overcrowding at Newton Road. Later the two schools rejoined with Urmston Grammar School for Girls to become one again. Since then the school has developed various new buildings and facilities. These include the Reading Room, the Theatre and the Fitness Suite as well as a state of the art Music Room which was opened by George Fenton. The school offers a secure environment with access to the very latest facilities, including cloud access and campus wide WiFi. Urmston Grammar was awarded specialist Science College status in 2004 and later, in 2007 it was awarded High Performing Specialist College status, and as from April 2008 Language College status as a second specialism. Urmston Grammar School converted to academy status as of September 2010, where it was 1 of the first 32 schools to convert, since then it has been known as Urmston Grammar. In the English Baccalaureate the school appeared 55th in the list of state schools in England.

Academic performance
The majority of the school's pupils go on to higher education; in the 2005 academic year, 90% went on to university. Urmston Grammar's most recent Ofsted report (2008) graded the school as "outstanding".

In GCSE, 60% of all examinations sat were awarded either A/A* grade in 2010 which increased to 63% in 2014 and has been roughly at this level since. 2013 Urmston Grammar achieved 80% in the Baccalaureate.

In A-level the school generally achieves 60% A*-B, which increases roughly by 1% year-on-year with 2017 Urmston Grammar students recording their highest number of A*-A grades. In 2011 the school was placed 89th in The Guardian 'Top 100 Selective Schools' and in 2012 was placed 86th in The Independent 'The Top 100 Selective Schools at A-level'.

Extra-curricular activities 
The school has a range of extra-curricular activities including sport, music, drama and science-related clubs and activities such as debating. Café Scientifique gives students the chance to discuss science-related topics; it is the longest running Café Scientifique programme in the UK.

The school has a rooftop greenhouse and a Biology Garden.

Pupils have the opportunity to make residential visits at home and abroad.

Notable former pupils

 Air Vice-Marshal Steven Chisnall CB, Station Commander of RAF Halton 1998–99
 William Hall, Professor of Nuclear Engineering at the University of Manchester 1959–86 and pioneer of the British nuclear power industry
 Stephen Hesford, MP
 Paul Honeyford, biographer and linguist
 Keith Hopwood, guitarist with Herman's Hermits
 Judy Loe, actress & mother of Kate Beckinsale
 Ray Lowry, cartoonist, illustrator and satirist
 Sir Patrick Russell, high court judge and Lord Justice
 Matthew Kelly, TV personality and host of Stars in Their Eyes.
 Paul Stenning, biographer and ghostwriter
 Thomas Brady, professional rugby union player for Leicester Tigers, formerly with Sale Sharks
 Adam Brown, radio presenter at Radio X
 Patrick Larley, composer
 Steve Taylor, lecturer and author

References

Grammar schools in Trafford
Academies in Trafford